Comercial Futebol Clube (SP), commonly referred to as Comercial de Ribeirão Preto or simply as Comercial, is a professional association football club based in the city of Ribeirão Preto, São Paulo, Brazil. The team participates in the Campeonato Paulista Série A2, the second tier of the São Paulo state football league.

The club's home colours are white and black and the team mascot is a lion.

History
On October 10, 1911, some business owners from Ribeirão Preto founded Commercial Football Club and the club soon became very wealthy. The field from Estádio da Rua Tibiriçá was one of the first in Brazil to receive grass, because the club's supporters complained of the dust in the air during the games. In 1936, the club has experienced a financial crisis and the Football Department was closed. In 1956, Commercial merged with Paineiras and become Comercial Football Club, entering the second division from Campeonato Paulista that same year.

In 1958, Comercial won its first title, the Campeonato Paulista Second Level, beating Corinthians of Presidente Prudente in the final. The club was promoted to the following year's first level.

In 1978, the club competed in the Campeonato Brasileiro Série A for the first time. The club finished in the 42nd position.

In 1979, the club competed in the Campeonato Brasileiro Série A for the second time. The club finished in the 14th position, ahead of clubs like Grêmio, Fluminense and Botafogo (RJ).

Current squad

Achievements

 Campeonato Paulista Série A2:
 Winners (1): 1958

Stadium

Comercial's home stadium is Estádio Dr. Francisco de Palma Travassos, nicknamed Jóia (Jewel), inaugurated in 1964, with a maximum capacity of 35,000 people.

The club also owns a training ground, named Centro de Treinamento Francisco de Palma Travassos.

The derby
Comercial's rival is Botafogo (SP). The match between the two clubs is nicknamed Come-Fogo (truncation of Comercial and Botafogo). It is one of the oldest Brazilian derbies and some matches have had an attendance of over 30,000 people. Famous footballers, like Sócrates, Raí and Zé Mário played the derby. The derby is disputed not only in football, but also in basketball.

Club colors
The club's official club colors are black and white. The club's home kit is all white.

Mascot
Comercial's mascot is a lion, called Leão, which is the Portuguese word for lion.

Nickname
The club is nicknamed Bafo, meaning Breath, and Leão do Norte, meaning Lion of the North.

References

External links
 Comercial Futebol Clube (SP) at Arquivo de Clubes
 Comercial Futebol Clube (SP) at Futebol Interior

 
Association football clubs established in 1911
Football clubs in São Paulo (state)
1911 establishments in Brazil